The Development Financial Institutions Act 2002, is a Malaysian law which enacted to make provisions for the regulation and supervision of development financial institutions and for matters connected therewith.

Structure
The Development Financial Institutions Act 2002, in its current form (1 October 2008), consists of nine Parts containing 130 sections and one schedule (including one amendment).
 Part I: Preliminary
 Part II: Management, Ownership and Control
 Part III: Restrictions on Business
 Part IV: Obligations and Sourcing of Funds
 Part V: Dealings with Government Funds
 Part VI: Control of Defaulter
 Part VII: Auditor and Accounts
 Part VIII: Examination and Investigation
 Part IX: Miscellaneous
 Schedule

References

External links
 Development Financial Institutions Act 2002  

2002 in Malaysian law
Malaysian federal legislation